is a Japanese football player currently playing for Hokkaido Consadole Sapporo.

Career statistics

Club
Updated to the start of 2023 season.

National team career statistics

Appearances in major competitions

References

External links

Profile at Consadole Sapporo

1989 births
Living people
Association football people from Hokkaido
Japanese footballers
J1 League players
J2 League players
Hokkaido Consadole Sapporo players
Association football midfielders
People from Date, Hokkaido